Alice Springs railway station is located on the Adelaide–Darwin railway in Alice Springs.

History
The original Alice Springs station opened in Railway Terrace in 1929, when the Central Australia Railway opened. A freight yard was located on what is now Murray Neck's shopping complex.

The present station opened on 9 October 1980 when a new line opened from Tarcoola. The station was included in the sale of Australian National's passenger operations to Great Southern Rail on 1 November 1997. It served as the terminus of the line until it was extended to Darwin in February 2004.

Station features
In the foyer of the current station is a memorial, by sculptor Gabriel Stark, this memorial is in memory of the Afghan camel trains that transported supplies to Central Australia before the arrival of the train.

Services
Alice Springs station is served by The Ghan which operates weekly in each direction with some exceptions.

References

External links

Station details Australian Rail Maps
Route Information Tarcoola to Alice Springs Chris' Commonwealth Railways

Railway stations in the Northern Territory
Railway stations in Australia opened in 1980
Transport in Alice Springs